George Economou may refer to:

 George Economou (poet) (born 1934), American poet and translator
 George Economou (shipbuilder) (born 1953), Greek billionaire shipowner
 George Economou (Manhattan Project) (1923–2003), American optical systems expert, who worked on the development of the first atomic bomb